West Indian Gazette (WIG) was a newspaper founded in Brixton, London, England, by Trinidadian communist & black nationalist activist Claudia Jones (1915–1964) in March 1958. The title as displayed on its masthead was subsequently expanded to West Indian Gazette And Afro-Asian Caribbean News. WIG is widely considered to have been Britain's first major black newspaper. Jones, who originally worked on its development with Amy Ashwood Garvey, was its editor. WIG lasted until 1965, but always struggled financially, closing eight months and four editions after Claudia Jones's death.

History 
Started as a monthly, the West Indian Gazette quickly gained a circulation of 15,000. The offices of the newspaper were located in the centre of the then developing Caribbean community in south London, at 250 Brixton Road, above a record shop.

Impact 
Carole Boyce Davies, biographer of Claudia Jones, ascribes to the West Indian Gazette "a foundational role in developing the Caribbean diaspora in London". According to Donald Hinds, who worked as a journalist on WIG: "It was not merely a vehicle to bring the news of what was happening back home and in the diaspora to Britain. It also commented on the arts in all their forms.... It published poems and stories. Its trenchant editorials did not stop at Britain but had an opinion on the what, where and why of the cold war’s hot spots."

Jones herself, in her last published essay, "The Caribbean Community in Britain", said of WIG: "The newspaper has served as a catalyst, quickening the awareness, socially and politically, of West Indians, Afro-Asians and their friends. Its editorial stand is for a united, independent West Indies, full economic, social and political equality and respect for human dignity for West Indians and Afro-Asians in Britain, and for peace and friendship between all Commonwealth and world peoples."

Further reading 
 Carole Boyce Davies, Left of Karl Marx: The Political Life of Black Communist Claudia Jones, Duke University Press, 2008.
 Bill Schwarz, "‘Claudia Jones and the West Indian Gazette’: Reflections on the Emergence of Post‐colonial Britain", Twentieth Century British History Volume 14, Issue 3, pp. 264–285.

References 

Afro-Caribbean culture in London
Black British culture in London
Black British mass media
Defunct newspapers published in the United Kingdom
National newspapers published in the United Kingdom
Newspapers published in London
Publications disestablished in 1965
Publications established in 1958